Trincomalee Hospital is a government hospital in Trincomalee, Sri Lanka. It is the leading hospital in Trincomalee District and is controlled by the provincial government in Trincomalee. As of 2010 it had 379 beds. The hospital is sometimes called Trincomalee General Hospital or Trincomalee District General Hospital.

In December 2021, due to lack on space on the current site, the Ministry of Health initiated discussions to construct a new hospital outside the city of Trincomalee but in a location close to the city.

References

Hospital
Hospitals in Trincomalee District
Provincial government hospitals in Sri Lanka